The 1996 United States Senate election in Rhode Island took place on November 5, 1996. Incumbent Democratic U.S. Senator Claiborne Pell decided to retire. Democratic nominee U.S. Representative Jack Reed won the open seat.

Democratic primary

Candidates
 Jack Reed, U.S. Representative
 Donald Gill

Results

Republican primary

Candidates
 Nancy Mayer, Treasurer of Rhode Island
 Thomas R. Post, Jr.
 Theodore Leonard

Results

General election

Candidates
 Donald Lovejoy (I)
 Nancy Mayer (R), Treasurer of Rhode Island
 Jack Reed (D), U.S. Representative

Results

See also 
 1996 United States Senate elections

References 

Rhode Island
1996
1996 Rhode Island elections